Kigurumi may refer to:

 Kigurumi (band), a Japanese J-pop duo
 Kigurumi, Japanese term for a costumed character
 Cosplay pajamas, a type of Japanese onesie that resembles an animal
 Animegao kigurumi, a type of costumed character and cosplay with an anime mask
 Kigurumi Harōkitei, a character in the manga series Joshiraku